The final of the Men's Pole Vault event at the 1997 World Championships in Athletics was held on Sunday August 10, 1997, in Athens, Greece.

Medalists

Schedule
All times are Eastern European Time (UTC+2)

Abbreviations
All results shown are in metres

Records

Results

Qualification
Qualification: Qualifying Performance 5.75 (Q) or at least 12 best performers (q) advance to the final.

Group A

Group B

Final

- Mens Pole Vault, 1997 World Championships In Athletics
Pole vault at the World Athletics Championships